The Jordan Football Association is the governing body for football in Jordan. The JFA was awarded best association of the AFC in 2013.

History

Tournaments
Jordan is known to be the Dark Horse of Asian Football, They were one play-off away from reaching the 2014 FIFA World Cup, they lost to Uruguay in a two-legged play-off. The most recent tournament they played was the 2019 AFC Asian Cup where they lost to Vietnam on Penalties in the Round of 16. The farthest Jordan got in the AFC Asian Cup was in 2004 and 2011, reaching the quarter-finals both times as they were paired with Asian Powerhouses such as Japan & South Korea, however, as an underdog they exceeded expectations and made it past the group stages. In 2015 they lost in the group stage for the first and only time. Jordan has never qualified for the FIFA World Cup and the first AFC Asian Cup they played in was in 2004.

Affiliation
 FIFA
 AFC
 Union of Arab Football Associations
 WAFF

Board members
President: Prince Ali Bin Hussein
Vice President: Marwan Juma
Secretary General: Samar Nassar
Media Consultant: Mohammad Ayasrah
Head of the Marketing and Communications: Mohammad Ayasrah 
Head of the Department of Referees: Salem Mahmoud
Head of the Department of Competitions: Awad Al-Shuaibat

Sponsors
Arab Bank
Hyundai Motor
Medlabs
Jordan Insurance Company

Jordan Football Association competitions
Jordan League 
Jordan FA Cup 
Jordan FA Shield 
Jordan Super Cup

Current title holders

Clubs formed by Palestinian refugee camps
There are four clubs in Jordan formed by Palestinian refugee camps and they are the following: 
Al-Wahdat SC 
Al-Baqa'a SC 
Shabab Al-Hussein 
Al-Jalil (Irbid)

List of football fields and stadiums in Jordan
Amman International Stadium (Amman)
King Abdullah Stadium (Amman)
Prince Mohammed Stadium (Zarqa)
Al-Hassan Stadium (Irbid)
Prince Hashim Stadium (Al-Ramtha)
Prince Faisal Stadium (Karak)
Prince Al-Hussein Stadium (Al-Salt)
Petra Stadium (Amman)
Al-Madaba Field (Madaba)
Al-Aqaba Field (Aqaba) 
Al-Israa' Field (Amman) 
Prince Ali Stadium (Mafraq) 
Ajloun Field (Ajloun) 
Ghamdan Field (Amman)

See also
 Jordan national football team 
 Jordan women's national football team
 Jordan national under-23 football team
 Jordan national under-20 football team 
 Jordan national under-17 football team

References

External links
 Official website
 Jordan at FIFA site
 Jordan at AFC site
 NOOSOOR.com Jordan Football News & Statistics

Football in Jordan
Jordan
Football
Sports organizations established in 1949